El Sur ("The South") is a 1983 drama film directed by the Spanish filmmaker Victor Erice, produced by Elias Querejeta, starring Icíar Bollaín as the adult main character. Written by Jose Luis Lopez Linares, it is based on Adelaida García Morales' short novel of the same name.

As in the novella, the screenplay takes place solely in the north of Spain, however the novella picks up where the screenplay leaves off, taking Estrella on a journey to the south of Spain. Producer Elías Querejeta decided not to allow the filming of the latter 90 minutes which would have been filmed in the south. Querejeta attributed this to lack of funds, although neither Erice nor the film's cinematographer, José Luis Alcaine, believed that was the reason. Erice felt the film was incomplete and described it as an "unfinished drama" even though it was well received by critics.

Plot
This film tells the story of a young girl named Estrella (Sonsoles Aranguren), living in the north of Spain with her father, Augustin (Omero Antonutti), and her mother, Julia (Lola Cardona). Her father is a scientist who seemingly has the ability to divine water using a pendulum, but Estrella finds him mysterious. As she's growing up her father shares with her the art of divination, but does not talk about his own childhood.  Her grandmother comes to visit, and she learns that during the Spanish Civil War her father and grandfather had a falling out. Her grandfather supported Franco, but her father was a Republican. After the civil war her father vowed he would never return to the south again. Later she sees her father visit a movie theater, then eventually discovers that the films he patronizes all star an actress by the name of Irene Rios (Aurore Clément). She later finds out that Rios was her father's sweetheart in the south, and that he is still in love with her.

Cast
 Omero Antonutti - Agustín Arenas
 Sonsoles Aranguren - Estrella, 8 years
 Icíar Bollaín - Estrella, 15 years
 Aurore Clément - Irene Ríos / Laura
 Lola Cardona - Julia, Agustín's wife
 Rafaela Aparicio - Milagros
 Francisco Merino - Irene Ríos's Co-Star
 Maria Caro - Casilda
 José Vivó - Grand Hotel barman
 Germaine Montero - Doña Rosario
 José Luis Fernández, El Pirri - El Carioco

Reception
The film was entered into the 1983 Cannes Film Festival. It won the Gold Hugo at the 1983 Chicago International Film Festival.

El Sur was voted the eight-best Spanish film by professionals and critics in a 1996 Spanish cinema centenary.

References

External links
 

1983 films
1980s Spanish-language films
1983 drama films
Spain in fiction
Films based on Spanish novels
Films directed by Víctor Erice
Spanish drama films
1980s Spanish films